Augusto Silva may refer to:

 Augusto Silva (footballer, born 1902) (1902–1962), Portuguese football midfielder and manager
 Augusto Silva (footballer, born 1939), Portuguese footballer
 Augusto Santos Silva (born 1956), Portuguese minister and university professor
 Augusto da Silva (1876–1968), Brazilian Roman Catholic cardinal